The world's largest axe is located in Nackawic, New Brunswick, Canada.

It was commissioned, designed and built in 1991 by the B.I.D. Canada LTD. company in Woodstock. There is a time capsule embedded in the head of the axe.

Plaque
"The World's Largest Axe. This giant axe symbolizes the importance of the forest industry, past, present and future, to the Town of Nackawic and the Province of New Brunswick. 1991."

See also
List of world's largest roadside attractions

References

External links

 Various photos of Axe

Axes
Outdoor sculptures in Canada
Buildings and structures in York County, New Brunswick
Tourist attractions in York County, New Brunswick
Roadside attractions in Canada
Time capsules
1991 establishments in New Brunswick